Douglass Township may refer to the following places in the United States:

 Douglass Township, Butler County, Kansas
 Douglass Township, Michigan
 Douglass Township, Berks County, Pennsylvania
 Douglass Township, Montgomery County, Pennsylvania

See also 
 Douglas Township (disambiguation)

Township name disambiguation pages